Narinder Nath Vohra (born 5May1936), popularly referred as N. N. Vohra, is a retired 1959batch Indian Administrative Service (IAS) officer of Punjab cadre who was the 12thgovernor of the Indian state of Jammu and Kashmir. He was the first civilian governor of Jammu and Kashmir in eighteenyears after Jagmohan.

As an IAS officer, Vohra has also served as Principal Secretary to the Prime Minister of India, Home Secretary of India, Defence Secretary of India and Defence Production Secretary of India.

From February2003 until he became the governor of the state, Vohra had been the Government of India's interlocutor in Jammu and Kashmir. He was awarded India's second highest civilian honour, the Padma Vibhushan, for his contributors to the field civil service, in 2007.

Education 
Vohra is a postgraduate (MA) and topper in English from Panjab University. Vohra also was a visiting fellow at Queen Elizabeth House, University of Oxford.

Career

Before IAS 
Before being appointed an IAS officer, Vohra served as lecturer in the Panjab University.

As an IAS officer 
Vohra served in key positions for both the Government of India and the Government of Punjab, such as Secretary (Home), Commissioner and Secretary (Industries), Finance Commissioner, Commissioner (Urban Development), Secretary (Urban Development), Punjab's labour commissioner, Director (Information) and as Director (Panchayati Raj) in the Government of Punjab; as Union Home Secretary, Union Defence Secretary, Union Defence Production Secretary, additional secretary in the Department of Defence of the Ministry of Defence, joint secretary in the Ministry of Health and Family Welfare and as an area organiser in the Cabinet Secretariat in the Government of India.

Vohra also served as a consultant to the World Health Organization.

Defence Production Secretary 
Vohra was appointed Union Defence Production Secretary by the Appointments Committee of the Cabinet (ACC), he assumed the office of Defence Production Secretary on 1May1989, and remitted it on 1March1990.

Defence Secretary 
Vohra was appointed Union Defence Secretary by ACC, he assumed the office of Defence Secretary on 1March1990, and demitted it on 1April1993, serving for more than three years.

Home Secretary 
N. N. Vohra was appointed Union Home Secretary by ACC after the 1993Bombay serial bomb blasts, he assumed the office of Home Secretary on 1April1993, and demitted it and simultaneously superannuated from service on 31May1994.

Post Retirement

Principal Secretary to the Prime Minister 
N. N. Vohra was appointed Principal Secretary to the Prime Minister of India, Inder Kumar Gujral, and the administrative head of Prime Minister's Office by ACC in June1997, he assumed the office of principal secretary on 1July1997, and demitted it on 19March1998.

India’s special representative for carrying out the Jammu and Kashmir dialogue 
N. N. Vohra was appointed India's interlocutor for carrying out the Jammu and Kashmir dialogue by the Government of India in 2003, he remained as India's interlocutor till 2008, when he was appointed Governor of Jammu and Kashmir.

As the interlocutor, Vohra had been holding wide-ranging discussions with both the elected representatives in the state and also the separatists in a bid to forge a common ground for the all-round development of the state.

Governor of Jammu and Kashmir 

Vohra was appointed Governor of Jammu and Kashmir (J&K) by President of India in 2008, his first act as the governor of J&K was to rescind the controversial Amarnath shrine land transfer order.

Vohra was reappointed the governor of Jammu and Kashmir by the president of India in 2013. Vohra retired from the position of governor in August2018 and was replaced by Satya Pal Malik, a Bharatiya Janata Party politician and a former governor of the states of Bihar and Odisha.

Vohra ruled Jammu and Kashmir directly four times (governor's rule) during his tenure as governor, with his tenure as state governor being widely seen to be a positive one.

Awards and recognition 
 Vohra was conferred the Padma Vibhushan, India's second highest civilian honour, for his contributions to the field of civil service, in 2007.

Selected bibliography

See also 
 Vohra Report
 Governor of Jammu and Kashmir

References

External links 

|-

1936 births
Living people
Punjabi people
Governors of Jammu and Kashmir
Vohra, Narinder Nath
Recipients of the Padma Vibhushan in civil service
Indian Home Secretaries
Indian Administrative Service officers
Defence Secretaries of India
Alumni of the University of Oxford
Panjab University alumni
Academic staff of Panjab University
District magistrate